Ethmia argopa is a moth in the family Depressariidae. It was described by Edward Meyrick in 1910. It is found in Malaysia.

Adults are similar to Ethmia praeclara, but the forewings are broader, the black dots are larger and there are nine marginal dots. The hindwings are ochreous yellow.

References

Moths described in 1910
argopa